YARP (Yet Another Robot Platform) is an open-source software package, written in C++ for interconnecting sensors, processors, and actuators in robots.

See also

 Kismet (robot)
 iCub
 Robot Operating System (ROS)
 List of free and open source software packages
 Yet Another

References

 

 

 

Robotics suites
2002 software
2002 in robotics
Free software programmed in C++